Keokee Store No. 1, also known as the Keokee High School Gymnasium and Darnell's Store, is a historic company store located at Keokee, Lee County, Virginia.  It was built in 1910, by the Stonega Coke and Coal Company, and is two-story, gambrel-roofed stone building that has been altered both internally and externally from a community store into a school gymnasium.  It was significantly modified in 1939, and the modifications continued through 1954.  The building serves as a facility for athletic, educational, and entertainment activities.

It was listed on the National Register of Historic Places in 2007.

References

Commercial buildings on the National Register of Historic Places in Virginia
Commercial buildings completed in 1939
Buildings and structures in Lee County, Virginia
National Register of Historic Places in Lee County, Virginia
Company stores in the United States
Commercial buildings completed in 1910